Kim Gwang-Guk (born ) is a South Korean male volleyball player. He is part of the South Korea men's national volleyball team. On club level he plays for Woori Card.

References

External links
 profile at FIVB.org

1987 births
Living people
South Korean men's volleyball players
Place of birth missing (living people)
21st-century South Korean people